K. Naina Mohammad is an Indian politician and former Member of the Legislative Assembly. He was elected to the Tamil Nadu legislative assembly as a Dravida Munnetra Kazhagam candidate from Kadayanallur constituency in 1996 election.

References 

Dravida Munnetra Kazhagam politicians
Living people
Year of birth missing (living people)
Place of birth missing (living people)
Tamil Nadu MLAs 1996–2001